Jan Frederik Veldkamp (31 March 1941, Amsterdam - 12 November 2017) was a Dutch botanist, plant taxonomist and grass specialist.

He worked in the Rijksherbarium (National Herbarium of the Netherlands), he undertook various plant expeditions in Papua New Guinea. Which were documented between 1984- 2008 in Flora Malesiana Bulletin in about 400 publications. He was a student, friend and also Bridge partner of Dutch botanist Cornelis Gijsbert Gerrit Jan van Steenis (1901–1986). 

In 2008, botanists Yasushi Ibaragi and Shiro Kobayashi in J. Jap. Bot. vol.83 on page 108 published Veldkampia, which is a monotypic genus of flowering plants belonging to the family Poaceae. It was named in Veldkamp's honour.

References

1941 births
2017 deaths
Agrostologists
20th-century Dutch botanists
21st-century Dutch botanists
Fellows of the Linnean Society of London
Leiden University alumni
Academic staff of Leiden University
Scientists from Amsterdam